Tanners' Gate (or Gate of the Tannery or Gate of the Tanneries) may refer to:

 Bab ad-Debbagh, Marrakesh, Morocco
 Tanners' Gate, Jerusalem: one of the Old City gates